Akinlade Ogunbiyi is a Nigerian businessman and former political candidate. He is the chairman of Mutual Benefits Assurance PLC.

Early life 
Akin Ogunbiyi was born in Ile-Ogbo, Osun State. His parents were farmers and his father served as chairman of the Trade Association.

Akin Ogunbiyi attended primary school at A.U.D Primary School. He graduated with a degree in Agricultural Economics from Obafemi Awolowo University in Ife. He studied at the International Graduate School of Management, University of Navarra (IESE) Barcelona in Spain where he earned an Executive Masters in Business Administration. Ogunbiyi attended Lagos Business School. He earned a degree in History and an M Sc in Industrial Relations and Personnel Management from UNILAG.

He is an Associate of the Chartered Insurance Institute in London.

Career

Business
Akin Ogunbiyi is an Associate of the Chartered Insurance Institute, London. He trained in insurance in NICON. He then joined the Finance and Insurance Experts Limited - a multi-disciplinary consultancy firm. He is a pioneer Associate Director. Ogunbiyi is a fellow of the Institute Directors, Nigeria. He serves on the board of the Infrastructure Bank Plc and other Companies. He is Chairman Of Mutual Benefits Assurance PLC.

Politics
Ogunbiyi started politics in 2018 and joined the People's Democratic Party (PDP) hoping to become Governor of Osun State. On 23 July 2018, Ademola Adeleke emerged as the PDP candidate after defeating Ogunbiyi by seven votes.
On 26 April, 2022, Ogunbiyi declared his intention to participate in the gubernatorial race on the platform of Accord party, which he came in Third place behind Peoples Democratic Party (PDP) and All Progressives Congress (APC) after the 2022 gubernatorial elections.

References

Living people
Nigerian bankers
Obafemi Awolowo University alumni
Peoples Democratic Party (Nigeria) politicians
University of Lagos alumni
University of Navarra alumni
1962 births